Liuli, formerly known as Sphinx Hafen, is a settlement on the Tanzanian shore of Lake Malawi in the Mbinga District of Ruvuma province. It is notable for being the site of the first naval action of World War I.

The sphinx rocks
The settlement is distinguished on the lake shore by a sphinx-like series of 7 rocks lying offshore. The rocks indicate deep water, leading to its development by the Germans as a ship repair base. The Anglican missionary William Percival Johnson described the rocks as follows:

1914–18: Sphinxhafen in the war on Lake Nyasa
On 13 August 1914, in the first naval action of World War I, the British lake steamer gunboat HMS Gwendolen caught the German armed steamer  on a slipway at Sphinxhafen. The German steamship was named after the explorer Hermann von Wissmann who raised funds for the vessel as an anti-slavery gunboat in 1890. HMS Gwendolen commenced bombarding the German port. The King's African Rifles later attacked Sphinxhafen in May 1915.

The Liuli mission
Liuli was originally, as Sphinxhafen, a German mission. After World War I it became a mission station for the Universities' Mission to Central Africa. William Johnson is buried in the church there and regarded locally as a saint. The mission hospital, founded by the German mission, continues as St. Anne's Hospital, still the major health facility on the eastern lakeshore.

Liuli today
Liuli is today a stop on the lake ferry from Mbamba Bay, up the lakeshore as far as Liuli, and then across to the Malawi side of the lake.

References

External links 
 The German charity behind St. Anne's Hospital Liuli
 The UK charity behind St. Anne's Hospital Liuli

Wards of Ruvuma Region
Church of England missions